Stary Kichkinyash (İśke Keskenäş) is a rural locality (a village) in Starotumbagushevsky Selsoviet, Sharansky District, Bashkortostan, Russia. The population was 103 as of 2010. There is 1 street.

Geography 
Stary Kichkinyash is located 13 km northeast of Sharan (the district's administrative centre) by road. Novy Kichkinyash is the nearest rural locality.

References 

Rural localities in Sharansky District